Lankester is an English surname. Notable people with the name include:

Edwin Lankester (1814–1874), English surgeon and naturalist
Ray Lankester (1847–1929), British zoologist
Tim Lankester (born 1942), British civil servant and college president
Lankester Merrin (1890s-1970s), a fictional character in The Exorcist (novel) (1971), and one of the two main protagonists in the 1973 film adaptation, and several sequel films

See also
Cape Lankester, in the Antarctic
Lankester Botanical Garden, a public garden in Costa Rica